Apsarasas Kangri is a mountain in the Siachen subrange of the Karakoram mountain range. With an elevation of  it is the 96th highest mountain in the world. Apsarasas Kangri is located within the broader Kashmir region disputed between India, Pakistan and China. It is situated on the border between the areas controlled by China as part of the Xinjiang autonomous region, and the Siachen Glacier controlled by India as part of Ladakh.

Apsarasas was named by Grant Peterkin of the 1908 Workman expedition, from apsara ("fairies") and sas ("place"), thus "place of the fairies". There are at least three main summits of near-equal height, usually labeled I to III from west to east over a distance of 5 km. The eastern summit is separated from the other two by a saddle just over 6800 m high.

Only the western peak (Apsarasas I) appears to have been climbed. The first ascent was made over the west ridge by Yoshio Inagaki, Katsuhisa Yabuta and Takamasa Miyomoto of the Osaka University Mountaineering Club on  August 7, 1976. Apsarasas II and Apsarasas III are listed as "virgin peaks" by the Indian Mountaineering Foundation, and the eastern summit counts amongst the highest unclimbed peaks.

References

Mountains of Xinjiang
Seven-thousanders of the Karakoram
Mountains of Ladakh